The Okhotsk region may refer to:
 Okhotsky District in Russia;
 Okhotsk Subprefecture in Japan.